Aeolidiella sanguinea is a species of sea slug, an aeolid nudibranch in the family Aeolidiidae.

Distribution 
This marine species was described from Innislacken, Roundstone Bay, Ireland. It has been reported from the Atlantic coast of Europe from Scotland south to Portugal and in the Atlantic Ocean off the Azores.

Description
Aeolidiella sanguinea is an aeolidiid nudibranch with a translucent red body and cerata. The rhinophores and oral tentacles are tipped with white. The body attains a length between 30 mm and 45 mm.

References

Further reading
 Gofas, S.; Le Renard, J.; Bouchet, P. (2001). Mollusca. in: Costello, M.J. et al. (Ed.) (2001). European register of marine species: a check-list of the marine species in Europe and a bibliography of guides to their identification. Collection Patrimoines Naturels. 50: pp. 180–213.
 Picton B.E. & Morrow C.C., 1994 : A Field Guide to the Nudibranchs of the British Isles. Immel Publishing LtId., London

Aeolidiidae
Gastropods described in 1877